Stephen 'Stevie' Gow (born in Dumbarton on 6 December 1968) is a Scottish former footballer. He began his career with local amateur side Dumbarton United before signing senior with Dumbarton. There he spent the whole of this senior playing career, being an automatic selection in the Dumbarton defence for over a decade.

References

1968 births
Scottish footballers
Association football defenders
Dumbarton F.C. players
Scottish Football League players
Sportspeople from Dumbarton
Footballers from West Dunbartonshire
Living people